Marinobacter similis is a Gram-negative and motile bacterium from the genus of Marinobacter which has been isolated from seawater.

References

External links
Type strain of Marinobacter similis at BacDive -  the Bacterial Diversity Metadatabase	

Alteromonadales
Bacteria described in 2015